Băbăița is a commune in Teleorman County, Muntenia, Romania. It is composed of two villages, Băbăița and Merișani. It included two other villages until 2004, when they were split off to form Frăsinet Commune.

References

Communes in Teleorman County
Localities in Muntenia